Aphelia koebelei is a species of moth of the family Tortricidae first described by Obraztsov in 1959. It is found in North America, where it has been recorded from Alberta and the Northwest Territories east to Newfoundland. It has also been recorded in Washington.

The forewings are dull yellow to grey with fine brown reticulations (net-like lines). The hindwings are white.

References

Moths described in 1959
Aphelia (moth)
Moths of North America